Cigarettes After Sex is the debut studio album by American ambient pop band Cigarettes After Sex. It was released on June 9, 2017, by Partisan Records and received positive reviews from critics.

As of May 2018, it had sold over 20,000 copies in United Kingdom.

Reception

Accolades

Track listing

Personnel
Credits adapted from the liner notes of Cigarettes After Sex.

Cigarettes After Sex
 Greg Gonzalez – vocals, electric and acoustic guitars, recording, production
 Phillip Tubbs – keyboards
 Randy Miller – bass, graphic design
 Jacob Tomsky – drums

Additional personnel
 Rocky Gallo – recording on "Each Time You Fall In Love", mixing
 Greg Calbi – mastering

Charts

Weekly charts

Year-end charts

Certifications

Notes

References

2017 debut albums
Cigarettes After Sex albums
Partisan Records albums